Ahmed Eissa Elmohamady Abdel Fattah (born 9 September 1987) is an Egyptian former professional footballer who played as a right-back and captained the Egypt national football team.

Elmohamady moved to Premier League club Sunderland in 2010, initially on loan from Egyptian side ENPPI. He went on to make over 240 league appearances for Sunderland and Hull City before joining Aston Villa during the Summer 2017 transfer window. He has won promotion to the Premier League from the Championship three times; twice with Hull City and once with Aston Villa.

He was selected by the Egyptian national team's manager, Hassan Shehata, for his first international appearance in 2007 and has gone on to win 92 caps. He was part of the Egyptian squads that won the 2008 and 2010 Africa Cup of Nations.

Club career

ENPPI
Born in Basyoun, El Gharbia, Egypt, Elmohamady started his youth career at Ghazl El-Mahalla in 2003. He started to play for the first team in 2004 at the age of 17. Two years later, he joined ENPPI.

Although he started his career as a striker with Ghazl El Mahalla, he played as a right-sided defender after joining ENPPI.

For a long time, Elmohamady attracted the attention of several European clubs. However, ENPPI was reluctant to allow him to move to any of them. In summer 2007, ENPPI turned down an offer from Hertha BSC, because the German side failed to meet the Egyptian club's financial demands. The player refused another bid from Rapid București of Romania in 2007.

On 25 November 2008, Elmohamady completed a five-day trial with Premier League side Blackburn Rovers following Rovers' manager Paul Ince's request. Rovers' new manager, Sam Allardyce, sent a senior official to Egypt to initiate talks with the Egyptian club in January 2009. However, the deal fell through as Allardyce believed it would be difficult for Elmohamady to make immediate impact.

Sunderland
Elmohamady impressed Sunderland manager Steve Bruce while on trial with the Premier League side in August 2009. However, on 31 January 2010, Sunderland failed to sign him.
Belgian side Club Brugge were also interested in the player and had, according to ENPPI, already made an offer.
ENPPI accepted loan bids from both West Bromwich Albion and Sunderland for Elmohamady but while West Brom's offer was larger, Elmohamady chose to go to Sunderland, after being on trial.

On 1 July 2010, Elmohamady joined Sunderland after passing medicals for a season-long loan move from ENPPI for a £500,000 fee, with an option of a permanent deal for £2 million next summer.

Elmohamady made his debut for Sunderland in their 2–2 draw with Birmingham City on 14 August 2010. He won Man of the Match for his performances against Arsenal and Manchester City. Due to his impressive start at Sunderland, manager Steve Bruce expressed an interest in signing Elmohamady permanently in the January transfer window.

On 11 March 2011, Sunderland announced that they had taken up the option of a £2 million transfer which was included in the loan agreement, making Elmohamady's contract a permanent one on Wearside. On 9 June 2011, the permanent contract was officially confirmed by Sunderland, with Elmohamady signing a deal which will keep him at the Stadium of Light until 2014. Manager Steve Bruce added, "Ahmed has done well in his first season with the club and has shown plenty of potential. We look forward to helping him grow as a player and I think there is much more to come from him."

Elmohamady started Sunderland's first league match of the 2011–12 season away to Liverpool, and provided the assist for Sebastian Larsson's debut goal as the Black Cats drew 1–1. He scored his first goal from a header for Sunderland in a 2–2 draw against West Bromwich Albion on 1 October 2011. Elmohamady fell out of favour following the departure of Bruce in December 2011 and made no starts under his replacement, Martin O'Neill. At the end of the 2011–12 season, Elmohamady had made 21 appearances in all competitions.

Hull City

On 30 August 2012, Elmohamady moved to Hull City of the Championship on a season-long loan deal, favouring a move which would see him reunited with former Sunderland boss Steve Bruce. On 1 September, he made his debut for the club at the KC Stadium against Bolton Wanderers. On 18 September 2012 he scored his first goal for the club, scoring the first of his side's goals in a 3–2 victory against Leeds United at Elland Road. He also provided two assists during the derby at Elland Road. On 16 January 2013, Sunderland decided to use the recall-clause. On 31 January 2013 he returned to Hull on loan for the remainder of the 2012–13 season. At the annual awards ceremony on 20 April 2013, at the KC Stadium, Elmohamady was voted as the Player of the Year.

After being on loan from Sunderland for the 2012–13 season on 28 June 2013, Elmohamady signed a three-year contract to become a permanent member of the Hull City squad. He made his debut on the first day of the 2013–14 season in a 2–0 loss away at Chelsea. On 21 September 2013, Elmohamady scored his first goal in the 2013–14 Premier League season against Newcastle United. On 17 May 2014, he played in the FA Cup Final, which Hull lost 3–2 against Arsenal.

On 10 January 2015, in a match away to West Bromwich Albion, Elmohamady touched the ball just before his goalkeeper Allan McGregor picked it up. His touch counted as a backpass, resulting in a free kick for the home team inside the penalty area, from which Saido Berahino scored the only goal of the match.

On 23 June 2016, Elmohamady signed a 3-year extension to his contract at Hull City.

Aston Villa
On 19 July 2017, Elmohamady signed for Aston Villa for an undisclosed fee which would see him reunited with former Hull City boss Steve Bruce again. Elmohamady made his debut for Villa on the opening day of the 2017–18 season, a 1–1 home draw against former club Hull City. He scored his first goal for Aston Villa in the first game of the following season, on 6 August 2018, also against Hull City.

On 29 May 2019, Elmohamady played an instrumental part in Aston Villa's 2–1 victory over Derby County in the 2019 EFL Championship play-off Final - providing the assist for Anwar El Ghazi's opening goal.

Elmohamady scored his first Premier League goal since the 2014–15 season on 24 June 2020, a late equaliser away at Newcastle United.

On 28 May 2021, it was announced that Elmohamady would leave Aston Villa at the end of his contract.

In July 2022, Elmohamady returned to Aston Villa in a non-playing role as an ambassador during a pre-season tour of Australia.

International career
Elmohamady played several times for Egypt U21s and was a participant in the 2007 African Youth Championship which was held in Republic of the Congo. He was the rising star of the Egyptian team and one of the stars of the tournament despite playing out of position as a forward.

He made his senior international debut in August 2007 at the age of 19 in a friendly against Ivory Coast in Paris. He was included in Egypt's final 2008 Africa Cup of Nations squad. The tournament was held in Ghana and Egypt went on to win the competition with Elmohamady featuring as a substitute. Since then, he has cemented his place in the starting lineup as a right-back or winger. He started all of Egypt's six matches in the second round of the 2010 FIFA World Cup Qualifiers.

In the 2009 Confederations Cup, he was sent off in Egypt's opening match against Brazil for deliberately handling Lúcio's goal-bound effort in the last minute. Brazil would go on to score the penalty and win 4–3.

Personal life
Elmohamady is married to an Egyptian fashion designer and he has a son named Malik. In England, Sunderland fans nicknamed him "Elmo". Elmohamady is a Muslim.

Career statistics

International

International goals
As of match played 6 July 2019. Egypt score listed first, score column indicates score after each Elmohamady goal.

Honours
Hull City
 Football League Championship runner-up: 2012–13
 FA Cup runner-up: 2013–14
 Football League Championship play-offs: 2016

Aston Villa
 EFL Championship play-offs: 2019
 EFL Cup runner-up: 2019–20

Egypt
 Africa Cup of Nations: 2008, 2010; runner-up: 2017

Individual
 CAF Team of the Year: 2010
 Hull City Player of the Year: 2012–13

References

External links

Premier League profile

1987 births
Living people
Egyptian footballers
Egypt international footballers
Egyptian Muslims
People from Gharbia Governorate
Association football defenders
Association football wingers
Association football utility players
ENPPI SC players
Sunderland A.F.C. players
Hull City A.F.C. players
Aston Villa F.C. players
Premier League players
English Football League players
Egyptian Premier League players
Egyptian expatriate footballers
Expatriate footballers in England
2009 FIFA Confederations Cup players
2008 Africa Cup of Nations players
2010 Africa Cup of Nations players
2017 Africa Cup of Nations players
Africa Cup of Nations-winning players
2018 FIFA World Cup players
2019 Africa Cup of Nations players
FA Cup Final players
Egyptian expatriate sportspeople in England
Ghazl El Mahalla SC players